Sorting nexin-1 is a protein that in humans is encoded by the SNX1 gene. The protein encoded by this gene is a sorting nexin.  SNX1 is a component of the retromer complex.

Function 

This gene encodes a member of the sorting nexin family. Members of this family contain a phox (PX) domain, which is a phosphoinositide binding domain, and are involved in intracellular trafficking. This endosomal protein regulates the cell-surface expression of epidermal growth factor receptor. This protein also has a role in sorting protease-activated receptor-1 from early endosomes to lysosomes. This protein may form oligomeric complexes with other family members.

References

Further reading

External links